Muslims in Bosnia and Herzegovina can refer to:

 in terms of religion, Muslims in Bosnia and Herzegovina are all adherents of Islam in Bosnia and Herzegovina, including:
 majority of ethnic Bosniaks of Bosnia and Herzegovina who are adherents of Islam
 majority of ethnic Turks of Bosnia and Herzegovina who are adherents of Islam
 majority of Romani people in Bosnia and Herzegovina who are adherents of Islam
 members of other groups in Bosnia and Herzegovina who are adherents of Islam

 in terms of ethnicity:
 former designation for ethnic Bosniaks in Bosnia and Herzegovina (before 1993)
 current designation for remaining ethnic Muslims (Muslimani) in Bosnia and Herzegovina

See also 
 Bosnian Muslims (disambiguation)
 Religion in Bosnia and Herzegovina
 Demographics of Bosnia and Herzegovina